Duhai  (Curse) is a 1943 Indian Bollywood film. It was the sixth highest grossing Indian film of 1943.

Cast
Ansari
Shanta Apte
Noor Jehan

References

External links
 

1943 films
1940s Hindi-language films
Films scored by Pannalal Ghosh
Indian black-and-white films